Dysoptus prolatus is a species of moth in the family Arrhenophanidae. It is known only from the type locality and mostly from primary forests of La Selva, Costa Rica.

The length of the forewings is 4-5.2 mm for males and about 7.8 mm for females. Adults are on wing in January, February, June, July and September.

The larvae feed on Phellinus gilvus. They construct a larval case with a length of up to 17 mm and a maximum diameter of 2.2 mm. It is a firm, thin walled, cylindrical, dark gray tube irregularly covered with minute plant fragments.

Etymology
The specific name is derived from the Latin prolatus (extended, elongated), in reference to the greatly elongated saccus in the male genitalia of this species.

External links
Family Arrhenophanidae

Dysoptus
Taxa named by Donald R. Davis (entomologist)
Moths described in 2003